The International Group for Historic Aircraft Recovery (TIGHAR) is an American nonprofit organization based in Pennsylvania.  It was founded by Richard Gillespie in 1985. According to TIGHAR's Federal Tax Exemption Form 990 for Non Profits, the organization's mission is to "promote responsible aviation archaeological and historic preservation".

Amelia Earhart
TIGHAR has long been involved with the search for Amelia Earhart and advocates the theory that Earhart successfully landed on Gardner Island, now known as Nikumaroro.

In 2012, TIGHAR was searching for clues around the Kiribati Islands using sonar equipment with the help of the State Department and undersea explorer Robert Ballard.

Ballard led a 2019 expedition to locate Earhart's Electra or evidence that it landed on Nikumaroro as supposed by the Gardner/Nikumaroro hypothesis. After days of searching the deep cliffs supporting the island and the nearby ocean using state of the art equipment and technology, Ballard did not find any evidence of the plane or any associated wreckage of it. Allison Fundis, Ballard's Chief Operating Officer of the expedition, stated, “We felt like if her plane was there, we would have found it pretty early in the expedition.” Although Ballard maintains that the plane or significant portions still exist and will eventually be found, TIGHAR argues that the Electra has been "broken up" by the surf and other harsh environmental elements.

Glenn Miller
In January 2019, it was reported that TIGHAR would investigate Glenn Miller's disappearance. Per a BBC report, TIGHAR's interest in Glenn Miller was inspired by a fisherman's claims that he caught a plane wreck in his nets, then released it. Although TIGHAR has failed to independently corroborate the claims to date, and have not seen or verified the wreck, they maintain that there is a possibility that the reported debris could be associated with Glenn Miller. "These things often start with stories", says TIGHAR Executive Director Ric Gillespie.

References

External links 

Panel discussion on the disappearance of Amelia Earhart with members of TIGHAR, March 12, 2014

Non-profit organizations based in Delaware
Amelia Earhart
1985 establishments in Delaware